Phenylpyruvic acid is the organic compound with the formula C6H5CH2C(O)CO2H.  It is a keto acid.

Occurrence and properties
The compound exists in equilibrium with its E- and Z-enol tautomers.  It is a product from the oxidative deamination of phenylalanine.

When the activity of the enzyme phenylalanine hydroxylase is reduced, the amino acid phenylalanine accumulates and gets converted into phenylpyruvic acid (phenylpyruvate), which leads to 'Phenylketonuria (PKU)' instead of 'tyrosine' which is the normal product of phenylalanine hydroxylase.

Preparation and reactions
It can be prepared by many methods.  Classically it is produced from aminocinnamic acid derivatives. It has been prepared by condensation of benzaldehyde and glycine derivatives to give phenylazlactone, which is then hydrolyzed with acid- or base-catalysis. It can also be synthesized from benzyl chloride by double carbonylation.

Reductive amination of phenylpyruvic acid gives phenylalanine.

See also
 Phenylpyruvate decarboxylase
 Phenylpyruvate tautomerase
 Phenylketonuria

References 

Alpha-keto acids
Benzyl compounds